Eirenis coronelloides or (also known as Sinai dwarf racer) is a non-venomous snake  found in the Middle East.

Description 
Eirenis coronelloides adults range from 17.5 to 25 cm in length.

Body light brown, with distinct dark crown on the head dark dorsal bars, characterized by dark crown, ventral stripe or both in all specimens examined from Turkey and some specimens from Jordan, Iraq and Syria.

Distribution 
This species ranges from far-southeastern Turkey, northern and northeastern Iraq, and western and central Syria to northern Jordan.

It is found in scattered steppe vegetation on solid earth. It can be found under or between stones. It can be found in lightly cultivated agricultural areas.

Reproduction 
Oviparous, the female lays eggs.

References 

Eirenis
Reptiles of Turkey
Reptiles of Iraq
Reptiles of Syria
Reptiles of Jordan
Reptiles of the Middle East